Thoda Pyaar Thoda Magic (English: A Little Love, A Little Magic) is a 2008 Indian fantasy comedy-drama film with Saif Ali Khan and Rani Mukerji in lead roles, and Rishi Kapoor and Ameesha Patel in supporting roles. The child artists include Akshat Chopra, Shriya Sharma, Rachit Sidana and Ayushi Burman. Directed, written and co-produced by Kunal Kohli, the film is produced and distributed by Yash Chopra and Aditya Chopra under their banner Yash Raj Films.

Released on 27 June 2008 in India, it grossed ₹37.25 crores on a budget of ₹23 crores, and was deemed "flop" by Box Office India. It received generally mixed reviews, with praise for its performances and humor, but criticism for script and screenplay.

Plot 
Ranbir Talwar (Saif Ali Khan), a leading industrialist in India, is lonely because he has lost everyone who is dear to him which include his childhood friend, who moves away, and his mother, who passes away, during his childhood. Due to distraction, he mistakenly kills a husband and wife in a car accident. The judge sentences him to look after their four children until the youngest child turns 18 years of age, and to do so without sending them to a boarding school nor keeping them in the care of anyone else. Additionally, the judge also warns him that if he fails to look after them properly, then he will be sentenced to 20 years in prison without parole. The children resent Ranbir for his role in their parents' death and desire revenge, whereas he is unprepared to live with them, making both him and the children miserable in this situation.

One day, the children pray to God (Rishi Kapoor) for help. God discusses the matter with his fairylike angels and decides to send Geeta (Rani Mukerji), his favourite and the most whimsical of the angels, to unite Ranbir with the children. God warns her not to use her ability to alter reality during her time on earth. Geeta ignores God's warning and uses this power often, providing comic relief. She appoints herself as the children's governess and places the children in awe of her by using her transformative powers. Soon, she ingratiates herself with the children with her supportive affection and positiveness. The children begin to cherish her and depend on her while Ranbir remains perplexed and overwhelmed by her dominance of his affairs. He soon becomes enamored of her, despite the interference by his girlfriend Malaika (Ameesha Patel).

Ranbir's relationship with Malaika ends when Geeta asks if he wants to end their relationship. She along with the children successfully ruin her birthday party. Ranbir eventually begins getting involved with the children's lives after Geeta tells him that he just needs to see their dreams and see what troubles them. As Ranbir and the children slowly bond, the children forsake their desire for revenge and treat him as an older brother.
On one such incident, Ranbir took the kids and Geeta along to Los Angeles as he has a conference trip with his boss. He invites them to play golf and the oldest child who wishes to gain revenge and mistreats the children of the boss. He throws insults at the children but Ranbir defends them. Geeta is called back to heaven as she has succeeded in uniting Ranbir and the children. Upset, Ranbir and the children go to a church to pray that she returns to them. After God talks with Geeta, he concedes to her wishes and changes Geeta into a human who now has emotions allowing her to return to the children. Geeta marries Ranbir and gives birth to a daughter, who inherits the ability to alter reality, despite Geeta's loss of her own power. Nevertheless, they all live happily ever after.

Cast 
 Rishi Kapoor as God 
 Rani Mukerji as Geeta 
 Saif Ali Khan as Ranbir Talwar
 Razak Khan as Pappu
 Ameesha Patel as Malaika 
 Akshat Chopra as Vashisht Walia
 Shriya Sharma as Aditi Walia
 Rachit Sidana as Iqbal Walia
 Ayushi Burman as Avantika Walia
 Sharat Saxena as Judge Jaswant Rai
 Mahesh Thakur as Lawyer
 Tarana Raja as Kapoor
 Danish Aslam as Mr. Gupta, Kid Ranbir's Teacher
 Biren Patel as Yada
 Cameron Pearson as Steve
 Tigerlily Perry as Michelle
 Steven Schneider as American Boy

Production

Development
In September 2007, the film began shooting in Delhi with some portions also being shot in Alibaug, Bangkok and Los Angeles. The shooting of the film was completed on 3 February 2008.

Rani Mukerji sports a one-layered outfit designed by Manish Malhotra throughout the film while some layers have been taken off according to the requirements of each scene. Kunal Kohli initially asked Ameesha Patel to lose slight weight for her role in the film. Kohli and Malhotra spent hours deciding her look in the film. She dons a yellow bikini in the film in the hit song ''Lazy Lamhe''.

Soundtrack 

The music of the film was composed by Shankar–Ehsaan–Loy with lyrics by Prasoon Joshi.

Release 
The film had a decent opening at the box office and picked up during the first weekend. However, It could not sustain business for long, due to the release of 2 big movies, Love Story 2050 and Jaane Tu... Ya Jaane Na the following weekend, of which the former was a disaster and the latter became a super-hit at the box office.

Box Office
According to Box Office India, Thoda Pyaar Thoda Magic had a poor opening and altogether grossed . It was declared a 'hit' at the box office.

Critical Reception
On Rotten Tomatoes, the film has an approval rating of 88% based on 8 critics reviews.

Noyon Jyoti Parasara of AOL India gave the movie 3 stars out of 5 saying, "The story brings out quite a few emotions. And this is helped by its simplicity." One India Entertainment said that, "It takes you back to the light-hearted, feel-good cinema made by directors of calibre like Hrishikesh Mukherjee and Basu Chatterjee."

References

External links 
 
 

2008 films
2000s Hindi-language films
Indian romantic fantasy films
2008 comedy-drama films
Yash Raj Films films
Films scored by Shankar–Ehsaan–Loy
Films shot in Bangkok
Films shot in Delhi
Films shot in Los Angeles
Indian films with live action and animation
Films directed by Kunal Kohli
Fiction about God